The Kammaṭṭhāna Forest Tradition of Thailand (from   meaning "place of work"), commonly known in the West as the Thai Forest Tradition, is a lineage of Theravada Buddhist monasticism.

The Thai Forest Tradition started around 1900 with Ajahn Mun Bhuridatto, who wanted to practice Buddhist monasticism, and its meditative practices, according to the normative standards of pre-sectarian Buddhism. After studying with Ajahn Sao Kantasīlo and wandering through the north-east of Thailand, Ajahn Mun reportedly became a non-returner and started to teach in North-East Thailand. He strived for a revival of the Early Buddhism, insisting on a strict observance of the Buddhist monastic code, known as the Vinaya, and teaching the practice of jhāna and the realisation of nibbāna.

Initially, Ajahn Mun's teachings were met with fierce opposition, but in the 1930s his group was acknowledged as a formal faction of Thai Buddhism, and in the 1950s the relationship with the royal and religious establishment improved. In the 1960s, Western students started to be attracted to the movement, and in the 1970s Thai-oriented meditation groups spread in the West.

Underlying attitudes of the Thai Forest Tradition include an interest in the empirical effectiveness of practice, the individual's development, and the use of skill in their practice and living.

History

The Dhammayut movement (19th century)

Before authority was centralized in the 19th and early 20th centuries, the region known today as Thailand was a kingdom of semi-autonomous city states (Thai: mueang). These kingdoms were all ruled by a hereditary local governor, and while independent, paid tribute to Bangkok, the most powerful central city state in the region. Each region had its own religious customs according to local tradition, and substantially different forms of Buddhism existed between mueangs. Though all of these local flavors of regional Thai Buddhism evolved their own customary elements relating to local spirit lore, all were shaped 
by the infusion of Mahayana Buddhism and Indian Tantric traditions, which arrived in the area prior to the fourteenth century. Additionally, many of the monastics in the villages engaged in behavior inconsistent to the Buddhist monastic code (Pali: vinaya), including playing board games, and participating in boat races and waterfights. 

In the 1820s young Prince Mongkut (1804–1866), the future fourth king of the Rattanakosin Kingdom (Siam), ordained as a Buddhist monk before rising to the throne later in his life. He travelled around the Siamese region, and quickly became dissatisfied with the caliber of Buddhist practice he saw around him. He was also concerned about the authenticity of the ordination lineages, and the capacity of the monastic body to act as an agent that generates positive kamma (Pali: puññakkhettam, meaning "merit-field").

Mongkut started to introduce innovations and reforms to a small number of monks, inspired by his contacts with western intellectuals. He rejected the local customs and traditions, and instead turned to the Pali Canon, studying the texts and developing his own ideas on them. Doubting the validity of the existing lineages, Mongkut searched for a lineage of monks with an authentic practice, which he found among the Burmese Mon people in the region. He reordained among this group, which formed the basis for the Dhammayut movement. Mongkut then searched for replacements of the classical Buddhist texts lost in the final siege of Ayutthaya. He eventually received copies of the Pali Canon as part of a missive to Sri Lanka. With these, Mongkut began a study group to promote understanding of Classical Buddhist principles.

Mongkut's reforms were radical, imposing a scriptural orthodoxy on the varied forms of Thai Buddhism of the time, "trying to establish a national identity through religious reform." A controversial point was Mongkut's belief that nibbana can't be reached in our degenerated times, and that the aim of the Buddhist order is to promote a moral way of life, and preserve the Buddhist traditions.

Mongkut's brother Nangklao, King Rama III, the third king of the Rattanakosin Kingdom, considered Mongkut's involvement with the Mons, an ethnic minority, to be improper, and built a monastery on the outskirts of Bangkok. In 1836, Mongkut became the first abbot of Wat Bowonniwet Vihara, which would become the administrative center of the Thammayut order until the present day.

The early participants of the movement continued to devote themselves to a combination of textual study and meditations they had discovered from the texts they had received. However, Thanissaro notes that none of the monks could make any claims of having successfully entered meditative concentration (Pali: samadhi), much less having reached a noble level.

The Dhammayut reform movement maintained strong footing as Mongkut later rose to the throne. Over the next several decades the Dhammayut monks would continue with their study and practice.

Formative period (around 1900)
The Kammaṭṭhāna Forest Tradition started around 1900 with Ajahn Mun Bhuridatto, who studied with Ajahn Sao Kantasīlo, and wanted to practice Buddhist monasticism, and its meditative practices, according to the normative standards of pre-sectarian Buddhism, which Ajahn Mun termed "the customs of the noble ones".

Wat Liap monastery and Fifth Reign reforms
While ordained in the Dhammayut movement, Ajahn Sao (1861–1941) questioned the impossibility to attain nibbana. He rejected the textual orientation of the Dhammayut movement, and set out to bring the dhamma into actual practice. In the late nineteenth century he was posted as abbot of Wat Liap, in Ubon. According to Phra Ajahn Phut Thaniyo, one of Ajahn Sao's students, Ajahn Sao was "not a preacher or a speaker, but a doer," who said very little when teaching his students. He taught his students to "Meditate on the word 'Buddho,'" which would aid in developing concentration and mindfulness of meditation objects.

Ajahn Mun (1870–1949) went to Wat Liap monastery immediately after being ordained in 1893, where he started to practice kasina-meditation, in which awareness is directed away from the body. While it leads to a state of calm-abiding, it also leads to visions and out-of-body experiences. He then turned to his keeping awareness of his body at all times, taking full sweeps of the body through a walking meditation practice, which leads to a more satisfactory state of calm-abiding.

During this time, Chulalongkorn (1853–1910), the fifth monarch of the Rattanakosin Kingdom, and his brother Prince Wachirayan, initiated a cultural modernization of the entire region. This modernization included an ongoing campaign to homogenize Buddhism among the villages. Chulalongkorn and Wachiraayan were taught by Western tutors, and held distaste for the more mystical aspects of Buddhism. They abandoned Mongkut's search for the noble attainments, indirectly stating that the noble attainments were no longer possible. In an introduction to the Buddhist monastic code written by Wachirayan, he stated that the rule forbidding monks to make claims to superior attainments was no longer relevant.

During this time, the Thai government enacted legislation to group these factions into official monastic fraternities. The monks ordained as part of the Dhammayut reform movement were now part of the Dhammayut order, and all remaining regional monks were grouped together as the Mahanikai order.

Wandering non-returner
After his stay at Wat Liap, Ajaan Mun wandered through the Northeast. Ajahn Mun still had visions, when his concentration and mindfulness were lost, but through trial and error he eventually found a method for taming his mind.

As his mind gained more inner stability, he gradually headed towards Bangkok, consulting his childhood friend Chao Khun Upali on practices pertaining to the development of insight (Pali: paññā, also meaning "wisdom" or "discernment"). He then left for an unspecified period, staying in caves in Lopburi, before returning to Bangkok one final time to consult with Chao Khun Upali, again pertaining to the practice of paññā.

Feeling confident in his paññā practice he left for Sarika Cave. During his stay there, Ajahn Mun was critically ill for several days. After medicines failed to remedy his illness, Ajahn Mun ceased to take medication and resolved to rely on the power of his Buddhist practice. Ajahn Mun investigated the nature of the mind and this pain, until his illness disappeared, and successfully coped with visions featuring a club-wielding demon apparition who claimed he was the owner of the cave. According to forest tradition accounts, Ajahn Mun attained the noble level of non-returner (Pali: "anagami") after subduing this apparition and working through subsequent visions he encountered in the cave.

Establishment and resistance (1900s–1930s)

Establishment

Ajahn Mun returned to the Northeast to start teaching, which marked the effective beginning of the Kammatthana tradition. He insisted on a scrupulous observance of the Vinaya, the Buddhist monastic code, and of the protocols, the instructions for the daily activities of the monk. He taught that virtue was a matter of the mind, not of rituals, and that intention forms the essence of virtue, not the proper conduct of rituals.
He asserted that meditative concentration was necessary on the Buddhist path, and that the practice of jhana and the experience of Nirvana was still possible even in modern times.

Resistance

Ajahn Mun's approach met with resistance from the religious establishment. He challenged the text-based approach of the city-monks, opposing their claims about the non-attainability of jhāna and nibbāna with his own experience-based teachings.

His report of having reached a noble attainment was met with mixed reaction among the Thai clergy. The ecclesiastical official Ven. Chao Khun Upali held Ajahn Run in high esteem, which would be a significant factor in the subsequent leeway that state authorities gave him and his students. Tisso Uan (1867–1956), who later rose to Thailand's highest ecclesiastical rank of somdet, thoroughly rejected the authenticity of Ajahn Mun's attainment.

Tension between the forest tradition and the Thammayut administrative hierarchy escalated in 1926 when Tisso Uan attempted to drive a senior Forest Tradition monk named Ajahn Sing—along with his following of 50 monks and 100 nuns and laypeople—out of Ubon, which was under Tisso Uan's jurisdiction. Ajahn Sing refused, saying he and many of his supporters were born there, and they weren't doing anything to harm anyone. After arguments with district officials, the directive was eventually dropped.

Institutionalisation and growth (1930s–1990s)

Acceptance in Bangkok
In the late 1930s, Tisso Uan formally recognized the Kammaṭṭhāna monks as a faction. However, even after Ajahn Mun died in 1949, Tisso Uan continued to insist that Ajahn Mun had never been qualified to teach because he hadn't graduated from the government's formal Pali studies courses.

With the passing of Ajahn Mun in 1949, Ajahn Thate Desaransi was designated the de facto head of the Forest Tradition until his death in 1994. The relationship between the Thammayut ecclesia and the Kammaṭṭhāna monks changed in the 1950s when Tisso Uan become ill and Ajahn Lee went to teach meditation to him to help cope with his illness.

Tisso Uan eventually recovered, and a friendship between Tisso Uan and Ajahn Lee began, that would cause Tisso Uan to reverse his opinion of the Kammaṭṭhāna tradition, inviting Ajahn Lee to teach in the city. This event marked a turning point in relations between the Dhammayut administration and the Forest Tradition, and interest continued to grow as a friend of Ajahn Maha Bua's named Nyanasamvara rose to the level of somdet and later the Sangharaja of Thailand. Additionally, the clergy who had been drafted as teachers from the Fifth Reign onwards were now being displaced by civilian teaching staff, which left the Dhammayut monks with a crisis of identity.

Recording of forest doctrine

In the tradition's beginning the founders famously neglected to record their teachings, instead wandering the Thai countryside offering individual instruction to dedicated pupils. However, detailed meditation manuals and treatises on Buddhist doctrine emerged in the late 20th century from Ajahn Mun and Ajahn Sao's first-generation students as the Forest tradition's teachings began to propagate among the urbanities in Bangkok and subsequently take root in the West.

Ajahn Lee, one of Ajahn Mun's students, was instrumental in disseminating Mun's teachings to a wider Thai lay audience. Ajahn Lee wrote several books which recorded the doctrinal positions of the forest tradition, and explained broader Buddhist concepts in the Forest Tradition's terms. Ajahn Lee and his students are considered a distinguishable sub-lineage that is sometimes referred to as the "Chanthaburi Line". An influential western student in the line of Ajahn Lee is Thanissaro Bhikkhu.

Forest monasteries in the South 

Ajahn Buddhadasa Bhikkhu (May 27, 1906 - May 25, 1993) became a Buddhist monk at Wat Ubon, Chaiya, Surat Thani in Thailand on July 29, 1926 when he was twenty years old, in part to follow the tradition of the day and to fulfill his mother’s wishes. His preceptor gave him the Buddhist name  “Inthapanyo” which means “The wise one”. He was a Mahanikaya monk and graduated at the third level of Dharma studies in his hometown and in Pali language studies at the third level in Bangkok. After he finished learning the Pali language, he realized that living in Bangkok was not suitable for him because monks and people there did not practice to achieve the heart and core of Buddhism. So he decided to go back to Surat Thani and practice rigorously and taught people to practice well according the core the teaching of the Buddha. Then he established Suanmokkhabālārama (The Grove of the Power of Liberation) in 1932 which is the mountain and forest for 118.61 acres at Pum Riang, Chaiya district, Surat Thani Thailand. It is a forest Dhamma and Vipassana meditation center. In 1989, he founded The Suan Mokkh International Dharma Hermitage for international Vipassana meditation practitioners around the world. There is a 10-day silent meditation retreat that starts on the 1st of each month for the whole year which is free, of no charge for international practitioners who are interested in practicing meditation. He was a central monk in the popularization of the Thai Forest Tradition in the South of Thailand. He was a great Dhamma author because he wrote so many Dhamma books that we have well known: Handbook for Mankind, Heart-wood from the Bo Tree, Keys to Natural Truth, Me and Mine, Mindfulness of Breathing and The A, B, Cs of Buddhism etc. On October 20, 2005, The United Nations Educational, Scientific and Cultural Organization (UNESCO) announced praise to “Buddhadasa Bhikkhu”, an important person in the world and celebrated the 100th anniversary on May 27, 2006. They held an academic activity to disseminate the Buddhist principles that Ajahn Buddhadasa had taught people around the world. So, he was the practitioner of a great Thai Forest Tradition who practiced well and spread Dhammas for people around the world to realize the core and heart of Buddhism.

Forest monasteries in the West

Ajahn Chah (1918–1992) was a central person in the popularisation of the Thai Forest Tradition in the west. In contrast to most members of the Forest Tradition he was not a Dhammayut monk, but a Mahanikaya monk. He only spent one weekend with Ajahn Mun, but had teachers within the Mahanikaya who had more exposure to Ajahn Mun. His connection to the Forest Tradition was publicly recognized by Ajahn Maha Bua. The community that he founded is formally referred to as The Forest Tradition of Ajahn Chah.

In 1967, Ajahn Chah founded Wat Pah Pong. That same year, an American monk from another monastery, Venerable Sumedho (Robert Karr Jackman, later Ajahn Sumedho) came to stay with Ajahn Chah at Wat Pah Pong. He found out about the monastery from one of Ajahn Chah's existing monks who happened to speak "a little bit of English". In 1975, Ajahn Chah and Sumedho founded Wat Pah Nanachat, an international forest monastery in Ubon Ratchatani which offers services in English.

In the 1980s the Forest Tradition of Ajahn Chah expanded to the West with the founding of Amaravati Buddhist Monastery in the UK. Ajahn Chah stated that the spread of Communism in Southeast Asia motivated him to establish the Forest Tradition in the West. The Forest Tradition of Ajahn Chah has since expanded to cover Canada, Germany, Italy, New Zealand, and the United States.

Involvement in politics (1994–2011)

Royal patronage and instruction to the elite
With the passing of Ajahn Thate in 1994, Ajahn Maha Bua was designated the new Ajahn Yai. By this time, the Forest Tradition's authority had been fully routinized, and Ajahn Maha Bua had grown a following of influential conservative-loyalist Bangkok elites. He was introduced to the Queen and King by Somdet Nyanasamvara Suvaddhano (Charoen Khachawat), instructing them how to meditate.

Forest closure

In recent times, the Forest Tradition has undergone a crisis surrounding the destruction of forests in Thailand. Since the Forest Tradition had gained significant pull from the royal and elite support in Bangkok, the Thai Forestry Bureau decided to deed large tracts of forested land to Forest Monasteries, knowing that the forest monks would preserve the land as a habitat for Buddhist practice. The land surrounding these monasteries have been described as "forest islands" surrounded by barren clear-cut area.

Save Thai Nation
In the midst of the Thai Financial crisis in the late 1990s, Ajahn Maha Bua initiated Save Thai Nation—a campaign which aimed to raise capital to underwrite the Thai currency. By the year 2000, 3.097 tonnes of gold was collected. By the time of Ajahn Maha Bua's death in 2011, an estimated 12 tonnes of gold had been collected, valued at approximated US$500 million. 10.2 million dollars of foreign exchange was also donated to the campaign. All proceeds were handed over to the Thai central bank to back the Thai Baht.

The Thai administration under Prime Minister Chuan Leekpai attempted to thwart the Save Thai Nation campaign in the late 1990s. This led to Ajahn Maha Bua's striking back with heavy criticism, which is cited as a contributing factor to the ousting of Chuan Leekpai and the election of Thaksin Shinawatra as prime minister in 2001. The Dhammayut hierarchy, teaming-up with the Mahanikaya hierarchy and seeing the political influence that Ajahn Maha Bua could wield, felt threatened and began to take action.

In the late 2000s bankers at the Thai central bank attempted to consolidate the bank's assets and move the proceeds from the Save Thai Nation campaign into the ordinary accounts which discretionary spending comes out of. The bankers received pressure from Ajahn Maha Bua's supporters which effectively prevented them from doing this. On the subject, Ajahn Maha Bua said that "it is clear that combining the accounts is like tying the necks of all Thais together and throwing them into the sea; the same as turning the land of the nation upside down."

In addition to Ajahn Maha Bua's activism for Thailand's economy, his monastery is estimated to have donated some 600 million Baht (US$19 million) to charitable causes.

Politic interest and death of Ajahn Maha Bua
Throughout the 2000s, Ajahn Maha Bua was accused of political leanings—first from Chuan Leekpai supporters, and then receiving criticism from the other side after his vehement condemnations of Thaksin Shinawatra.

Ajahn Maha Bua was the last of Ajahn Mun's prominent first-generation students. He died in 2011. In his will he requested that all of the donations from his funeral be converted to gold and donated to the Central Bank—an additional 330 million Baht and 78 kilograms of gold.

Practices

Meditation practices

The purpose of practice is to attain the deathless (Pali: amata-dhamma), i.e. Nibbāna. According to the Thai Forest Tradition's exposition, awareness of the deathless is boundless and unconditioned and cannot be conceptualized, and must be arrived at through mental training which includes states of meditative concentration (Pali: jhana). Forest teachers thus directly challenge the notion of "dry insight" (insight without any development of concentration), and teach that nibbāna must be arrived at through mental training which includes deep states of meditative concentration (Pali: jhāna), and "exertion and striving" to "cut" or "clear the path" through the "tangle" of defilements, setting awareness free, and thus allowing one to see them clearly for what they are, eventually leading one to be released from these defilements.

Kammaṭṭhāna — The Place of Work 
Kammaṭṭhāna, (Pali: meaning “place of work”) refers to the whole of the practice with the goal of ultimately eradicating defilement from the mind.

The practice which monks in the tradition generally begin with are meditations on what Ajahn Mun called the five "root meditation themes": the hair of the head, the hair of the body, the nails, the teeth, and the skin. One of the purposes of meditating on these externally visible aspects of the body is to counter the infatuation with the body, and to develop a sense of dispassion. Of the five, the skin is described as being especially significant. Ajahn Mun writes that "When we get infatuated with the human body, the skin is what we are infatuated with. When we conceive of the body as being beautiful and attractive, and develop love, desire, and longing for it, it's because of what we conceive of the skin."

Advanced meditations include the classical themes of contemplation and mindfulness of breathing:
The ten recollections: a list of ten meditation themes considered especially significant by the Buddha.
The asubha contemplations: contemplations of foulness for combating sensual desire.
The brahmaviharas: assertions of good-will for all beings to combat ill-will.
The four satipatthana: frames of reference to get the mind into deep concentration

Mindfulness immersed in the body and mindfulness of in-and-out breathing (ānāpānasati) are both part of the ten recollections and the four satipatthana, and are commonly given special attention as primary themes for a meditator to focus on.

Monastic routine

Precepts and ordination 

There are several precept levels: Five Precepts, Eight Precepts, Ten Precepts and the patimokkha. The Five Precepts (Pañcaśīla in Sanskrit and Pañcasīla in Pāli) are practiced by laypeople, either for a given period of time or for a lifetime. The Eight Precepts are a more rigorous practice for laypeople. Ten Precepts are the training-rules for sāmaṇeras and sāmaṇerīs (novitiate monks and nuns). The Patimokkha is the basic Theravada code of monastic discipline, consisting of 227 rules for bhikkhus and 311 for nuns bhikkhunis (nuns).

Temporary or short-term ordination is so common in Thailand that men who have never been ordained are sometimes referred to as "unfinished." Long-term or lifetime ordination is deeply respected. The ordination process usually begins as an anagarika, in white robes.

Customs 
Monks in the tradition are typically addressed as "Venerable", alternatively with the Thai Ayya or Taan (for men). Any monk may be addressed as "bhante" regardless of seniority.
For Sangha elders who have made a significant contribution to their tradition or order, the title Luang Por (Thai: Venerable Father) may be used.

According to The Isaan: "In Thai culture, it is considered impolite to point the feet toward a monk or a statue in the shrine room of a monastery." In Thailand monks are usually greeted by lay people with the wai gesture, though, according to Thai custom, monks are not supposed to wai laypeople. When making offerings to the monks, it is best not to stand while offering something to a monk who is sitting down.

Daily routine 

All Thai monasteries generally have a morning and evening chant, which usually takes an hour long for each, and each morning and evening chant may be followed by a meditation session, usually around an hour as well.

At Thai monasteries the monks will go for alms early in the morning, sometimes around 6:00 AM, although monasteries such as Wat Pah Nanachat and Wat Mettavanaram start around 8:00 AM and 8:30 AM, respectively. At Dhammayut monasteries (and some Maha Nikaya forest monasteries, including Wat Pah Nanachat), monks will eat just one meal per day. For young children it is customary for the parent to help them scoop food into monks bowls.

At Dhammayut monasteries, anumodana (Pali, rejoicing together) is a chant performed by the monks after a meal to recognize the mornings offerings, as well as the monks' approval for the lay people's choice of generating merit (Pali: puñña) by their generosity towards the Sangha.

Retreats

Dhutanga (meaning "austere practice" Thai) is a word generally used in the commentaries to refer to the thirteen ascetic practices. In Thai Buddhism it has been adapted to refer to extended periods of wandering in the countryside, where monks will take one or more of these ascetic practices. During these periods monks will live off of whatever is given to them by laypersons they encounter during the trip, and sleep wherever they can. Sometimes monks will bring a large umbrella-tent with attached mosquito netting known as a crot (also spelled krot, clot, or klod). The crot will usually have a hook on the top so it may be hung on a line tied between two trees.

Teachings

Original mind 

The mind (Pali: citta, mano, used interchangeably as "heart" or "mind" en masse), within the context of the Forest Tradition, refers to the most essential aspect of an individual, that carries the responsibility of "taking on" or "knowing" mental preoccupations. While the activities associated with thinking are often included when talking about the mind, they are considered mental processes separate from this essential knowing nature, which is sometimes termed the "primal nature of the mind".

Original Mind is considered to be radiant, or luminous (Pali: "pabhassara"). Teachers in the forest tradition assert that the mind simply "knows and does not die." The mind is also a fixed-phenomenon (Pali: "thiti-dhamma"); the mind itself does not move or follow out after its preoccupations, but rather receives them in place. Since the mind as a phenomenon often eludes attempts to define it, the mind is often simply described in terms of its activities.

The primal or original mind in itself is however not considered to be equivalent to the awakened state but rather as a basis for the emergence of mental formations, it is not to be confused for a metaphysical statement of a true self and its radiance being an emanation of avijjā it must eventually be let go of.

Ajahn Mun further argued that there is a unique class of "objectless" or "themeless" consciousness specific to Nirvana, which differs from the consciousness aggregate. Scholars in Bangkok at the time of Ajahn Mun stated that an individual is wholly composed of and defined by the five aggregates, while the Pali Canon states that the aggregates are completely ended during the experience of Nirvana.

Twelve nidanas and rebirth 

The twelve nidanas describe how, in a continuous process, avijja ("ignorance," "unawareness") leads to the mind's preoccupation with its contents and the associated feelings that arise from sense-contact. This absorption darkens the mind and becomes a "defilement" (Pali: kilesa), which lead to craving and clinging (Pali: upadana). This in turn leads to becoming, which conditions birth.

While birth is traditionally explained as rebirth in a new life, it is also explained in Thai Buddhism as the birth of self-view, which gives rise to renewed clinging and craving.

Teachers

Ajahn Mun

When Ajahn Mun returned to the Northeast to start teaching, he brought a set of radical ideas, many of which clashed with what scholars in Bangkok were saying at the time:
Like Mongkut, Ajahn Mun stressed the importance of scrupulous observance of the Buddhist monastic code (Pali: Vinaya). Ajahn Mun went further, and also stressed what are called the protocols: instructions for how a monk should go about daily activities such as keeping his hut, interacting with other people, etc.Ajahn Mun also taught that virtue was a matter of the mind, and that intention forms the essence of virtue. This ran counter to what people in Bangkok said at the time, that virtue was a matter of ritual, and by conducting the proper ritual one gets good results.
Ajahn Mun asserted that the practice of jhana was still possible even in modern times, and that meditative concentration was necessary on the Buddhist path. Ajahn Mun stated that one's meditation topic must be keeping in line with one's temperament—everyone is different, so the meditation method used should be different for everybody. Ajahn Mun said the meditation topic one chooses should be congenial and enthralling, but also give one a sense of unease and dispassion for ordinary living and the sensual pleasures of the world.
Ajahn Mun said that not only was the practice of jhana possible, but the experience of Nirvana was too. He stated that Nirvana was characterized by a state of activityless consciousness, distinct from the consciousness aggregate.To Ajahn Mun, reaching this mode of consciousness is the goal of the teaching—yet this consciousness transcends the teachings. Ajahn Mun asserted that the teachings are abandoned at the moment of Awakening, in opposition to the predominant scholarly position that Buddhist teachings are confirmed at the moment of Awakening. Along these lines, Ajahn Mun rejected the notion of an ultimate teaching, and argued that all teachings were conventional—no teaching carried a universal truth. Only the experience of Nirvana, as it is directly witnessed by the observer, is absolute.

Ajahn Lee

Ajahn Lee emphasized his metaphor of Buddhist practice as a skill, and reintroduced the Buddha's idea of skillfulness—acting in ways that emerge from having trained the mind and heart. Ajahn Lee said that good and evil both exist naturally in the world, and that the skill of the practice is ferreting out good and evil, or skillfulness from unskillfulness. The idea of "skill" refers to a distinction in Asian countries between what is called warrior-knowledge (skills and techniques) and scribe-knowledge (ideas and concepts). Ajahn Lee brought some of his own unique perspectives to Forest Tradition teachings:
 Ajahn Lee reaffirmed that meditative concentration (samadhi) was necessary, yet further distinguished between right concentration and various forms of what he called wrong concentration—techniques where the meditator follows awareness out of the body after visions, or forces awareness down to a single point were considered by Ajahn Lee as off-track.
 Ajahn Lee stated that discernment (panna) was mostly a matter of trial-and-error. He used the metaphor of basket-weaving to describe this concept: you learn from your teacher, and from books, basically how a basket is supposed to look, and then you use trial-and-error to produce a basket that is in line with what you have been taught about how baskets should be. These teachings from Ajahn Lee correspond to the factors of the first jhana known as directed-thought (Pali: "vitakka"), and evaluation (Pali: "vicara").
 Ajahn Lee said that the qualities of virtue that are worked on correspond to the qualities that need to be developed in concentration. Ajahn Lee would say things like "don't kill off your good mental qualities", or "don't steal the bad mental qualities of others", relating the qualities of virtue to mental qualities in one's meditation.

Ajahn Maha Bua

Ajahn Mun and Ajahn Lee would describe obstacles that commonly occurred in meditation but would not explain how to get through them, forcing students to come up with solutions on their own. Additionally, they were generally very private about their own meditative attainments.

Ajahn Maha Bua, on the other hand, saw what he considered to be a lot of strange ideas being taught about meditation in Bangkok in the later decades of the 20th century. For that reason Ajahn Maha Bua decided to vividly describe how each noble attainment is reached, even though doing so indirectly revealed that he was confident he had attained a noble level. Though the Vinaya prohibits a monk from directly revealing ones own or another's attainments to laypeople while that person is still alive, Ajahn Maha Bua wrote in Ajahn Mun's posthumous biography that he was convinced that Ajahn Mun was an arahant. Thanissaro Bhikkhu remarks that this was a significant change of the teaching etiquette within the Forest Tradition.
Ajahn Maha Bua's primary metaphor for Buddhist practice was that it was a battle against the defilements. Just as soldiers might invent ways to win battles that aren't found in military history texts, one might invent ways to subdue defilement. Whatever technique one could come up with—whether it was taught by one's teacher, found in the Buddhist texts, or made up on the spot—if it helped with a victory over the defilements, it counted as a legitimate Buddhist practice. 
Ajahn Maha Bua is widely known for his teachings on dealing with physical pain. For a period, Ajahn Maha Bua had a student who was dying of cancer, and Ajahn Maha Bua gave a series on talks surrounding the perceptions that people have that create mental problems surrounding the pain. Ajahn Maha Bua said that these incorrect perceptions can be changed by posing questions about the pain in the mind. (i.e. "what color is the pain? does the pain have bad intentions to you?" "Is the pain the same thing as the body? What about the mind?")
There was a widely publicized incident in Thailand where monks in the North of Thailand were publicly stating that Nirvana is the true self, and scholar monks in Bangkok were stating that Nirvana is not-self. (see: Dhammakaya Movement)At one point, Ajahn Maha Bua was asked whether Nirvana was self or not-self and he replied "Nirvana is Nirvana, it is neither self nor not-self". Ajahn Maha Bua stated that not-self is merely a perception that is used to pry one away from infatuation with the concept of a self, and that once this infatuation is gone the idea of not-self must be dropped as well.

Related Traditions
Related Forest Traditions are also found in other predominantly Buddhist Asian countries, including the Sri Lankan Forest Tradition of Sri Lanka, the Taungpulu Forest Tradition of Myanmar, and a related Lao Forest Tradition in Laos.

See also 
 Early Buddhist schools
 Early Buddhist texts
 Dhammayuttika Nikaya
 Maha Nikaya
 Forest Tradition of Ajahn Chah
 Galduwa Forest Tradition
 Sri Lankan Forest Tradition

Notes

References

Sources

Printed sources

Primary sources

 
 

 

 , translated from Thai by Thanissaro Bhikkhu.
 , translated from Thai by Thanissaro Bhikkhu.
 

 

 
 
 
 

 

 
 

 
 
 
 
 
 
 
 

 

Secondary sources

Web-sources

Further reading
Primary
 
Secondary

External links 

Monasteries
Portal for monasteries in the Ajahn Chah tradition
 Metta Forest Monastery
Forest Dhamma Monastery
About the Tradition
Significant figures with published and translated dhamma books — Access to Insight
An essay on the origins of the Thai Forest Tradition by Thanissaro Bhikkhu
Page about the forest tradition from Vimutti Buddhist monastery in New Zealand
About the Forest Tradition — Abhayagiri.org
Book by Ajahn Maha Bua about Kammatthana practice
Dhamma Resources
Thanissaro Bhikkhu's translations and dhamma talks
Resources on the Ajahn Chah Tradition
Books translated by Ajahn Dick Silaratano, Ajahn Suchard Abhijato, Ajahn Pannavaddho, and Thanissaro Bhikkhu

 
Theravada Buddhist orders
Buddhism in Thailand